Vieyra is a surname. Notable people with the surname include:

Federico Matías Vieyra (born 1988), Argentine handball player
Manuel Antonio Rojo del Río y Vieyra (1708–1764), Mexican friar 
Oscar Vieyra (born 1992), Mexican footballer
Paulin Soumanou Vieyra (1925–1987), Beninese/Senegalese film director and historian